Any Woman Can may refer to:

 Any Woman Can (TV series), a 1974–1975 home improvement series for women on CTV in Canada
 Any Woman Can!, a sex advice book written by David Reuben